Wesley Brian Kitts (also known as Wes Kitts) (born 22 May 1990) is an American weightlifter, two time Pan American Champion and Pan American Games Champion competing in the 105 kg category until 2018 and 109 kg starting in 2018 after the International Weightlifting Federation reorganized the categories.

Career
In 2018 he competed at the 2018 World Weightlifting Championships in the 109 kg division finishing 10th overall.

In 2019 he competed at the 2019 Pan American Weightlifting Championships in the 109 kg division winning a silver medal in the snatch and gold medals in the clean & jerk, his total of 399 kg was 17 kg more than the silver medalist, and a new Pan American record. On July 30 he competed in the 109 kg division at the Pan American Games. After the snatch portion he was in fourth place, a total of 18 kg behind Jorge Arroyo, he was able to complete his third lift of 217 kg in the clean & jerk to win the gold medal by 1 kg.

He has qualified to represent the United States at the 2020 Summer Olympics.

Major results

References

External links 
 

1990 births
Living people
Place of birth missing (living people)
American male weightlifters
Pan American Games medalists in weightlifting
Pan American Games gold medalists for the United States
Weightlifters at the 2019 Pan American Games
Medalists at the 2019 Pan American Games
Olympic weightlifters of the United States
Sportspeople from Knoxville, Tennessee
Weightlifters at the 2020 Summer Olympics
20th-century American people
21st-century American people